Roger Avermaete (1893 in Antwerp - 1988) was a Belgian writer who wrote in Dutch and French.

In 1968, he was part of the cross-arts team which created the Christophe Plantin Prize.

See also
 Belgian literature

Sources
 Roger Avermaete
 

1893 births
1988 deaths
Writers from Antwerp
Flemish writers
Belgian writers in French